The 2012 gubernatorial election in the Mexican state of Chiapas was held on Sunday, July 1, 2012. Incumbent Chiapas Governor Juan Sabines Guerrero of the Party of the Democratic Revolution (PRD) is retiring due to mandatory term limits, which limit all Mexican state governors to one, six-year term. The Chiapas gubernatorial election coincided with the 2012 Mexican presidential and general elections.

Candidates

References

2012 elections in Mexico
Chiapas
Gubernatorial
Politics of Chiapas
July 2012 events in Mexico